There are 46 recognized Scheduled Tribes in Madhya Pradesh, India, three of which have been identified as 'Particularly Vulnerable Tribal Groups (PTGs)(formerly known as 'Special Primitive Tribal Groups'). The population of Scheduled Tribals (ST) is 21.1% of the state population (15.31 million out of 72.62 million), according to the 2011 census. Bounded by the Narmada River to the north and the Godavari River to the southeast, tribal peoples occupy the slopes of the region's mountains.

The term "Scheduled Tribes" refers to specific indigenous peoples whose status is acknowledged to by the Constitution of India. The term Adivasi also applies to indigenous peoples of this area.

Diversity of tribes 
The diversity in the tribes across the state comes from differences in heredity, lifestyle, cultural traditions, social structure, economic structure, religious beliefs and language and speech. Due to the different linguistic, cultural and geographical environments, the diverse tribal world of Madhya Pradesh has been largely cut off from the mainstream of development.

Madhya Pradesh holds 1st rank among all the States/Union Territories (UTs) in terms of Special Tribal population and 12th rank in respect of the proportion of ST population to total population.

Most populous tribes 
According to the 2011 Census of India, Bhil is the most populous tribe with a total population of 4,618,068, constituting 37.7 per cent of the total ST population. Gond is the second largest tribe, with a population of 4,357,918 constituting 35.6 per cent. The next four populous tribes are: Kol, Korku, Sahariya and Baiga. These six tribes constitute 92.2 per cent of the total ST population of the State.

Pardhan, Saur and Bharia Bhumia have a population ranging from 105,692 to 2152,472; together, they form 3.2 percent of state population. Four tribes, namely, Majhi, Khairwar, Mawasi and Panika have populations in the range of 47,806 to 81,335, and account for another 2.2 percent of the ST population.

The remaining thirty three tribes (out of the total of 46 tribes) along with the generic tribes constitute the residual 2.5 per cent of total ST population. Tribes having below 1000 population are twelve in number.

Bhils have the highest population in Jhabua district followed by Dhar, Barwani and Khargone districts.

Gonds have major concentrations in Dindori district, Chhindwara, Mandla, Betul, Seoni and Shahdol districts. Other four major groups Kol, Korku, Sahariya and Baiga have registered the highest population in Rewa, Khandwa, Shivpuri and Shahdol districts respectively.

List of recognised tribes 

 Agariya
 Andh
 Baiga
 Bhaina
 Bharia Bhumia, Bhuinhar Bhumia, Bhumiya, Bharia, Paliha, Pando
 Bhattra
 Bhil, Bhilala, Barela, Patelia
 Bhil Meena
 Bhunjia
 Biar, Biyar
 Binjhwar
 Birhul, Birhor
 Damor, Damaria
 Dhanwar
 Gadaba, Gadba
 Gond; Arakh, Arrakh, Agaria, Asur, Badi Maria, Bada Maria, Bhatola, Bhimma, Bhuta, Koilabhuta, Koliabhuti, Bhar, Bisonhorn Maria, Chota Maria, Dandami Maria, Dhuru, Dhurwa, Dhoba, Dhulia, Dorla, Gaiki, Gatta, Gatti, Gaita, Gond Gowari, Hill Maria, Kandra, Kalanga, Khatola, Koitar, Koya, Khirwar, Khirwara, Kucha Maria, Kuchaki Maria, Madia, Maria, Mana, Mannewar, Moghya, Mogia, Monghya, Mudia, Muria, Nagarchi, Nagwanshi, Ojha, Raj, Sonjhari Jhareka, Thatia, Thotya, Wade Maria, Vade Maria, Daroi
 Halba, Halbi
 Kamar
 Karku
 Kawar, Kanwar, Kaur, Cherwa, Rathia, Tanwar, Chattri
 Keer (in Bhopal, Raisen and Sehore districts)
 Khairwar, Kondar
 Kharia
 Kondh, Khond, Kandh
 Kol
 Kolam
 Korku, Bopchi, Mouasi, Nihal, Nahul, Bondhi, Bondeya
 Korwa, Kodaku
 Majhi
 Majhwar
 Mawasi
 Mina (in Sironj sub-division of Vidisha district)
 Munda
 Nagesia, Nagasia
 Oraon, Dhanka, Dhangad
 Panika (in Chhatarpur, Datia, Panna, Rewa, Satna, Shahdol, Sidhi and Tikamgarh districts)
 Pao
 Pardhan, Pathari Saroti
 Pardhi (in Bhopal, Raisen and Sehore districts)
 Pardhi; Bahelia, Bahellia, Chita Pardhi, Langoli Pardhi, Phans Pardhi, Shikari, Takankar, Takia (in (i) Bastar, Chhindwara, Mandla, Raigarh, Seoni and Surguja districts; (ii) Baihar tehsil of Balaghat district; (iii) Betul and Bhainsdehi tehsils of Betul district; (iv) Bilaspur and Katghora tehsils of Bilaspur district; (v) Durg and Balod tehsils of Durg district; (vi) Chowki, Manpur and Mohala Revenue Inspectors Circles of Rajnandgaon district; (vii) Murwara, Patan and Sihora tehsils of Jabalpur district; (viii) Hoshangabad and Sohagpur tehsils of Hoshangabad district and Narsimhapur district; (ix) Harsud tehsil of East Nimar district; and (x) Dhamtari and Mahasamund districts and Bindra-Nawagarh tehsil of Raipur district)
 Parja
 Sahariya, Saharia, Seharia, Sehria, Sosia, Sor
 Saonta, Saunta
 Saur
 Sawar, Sawara
 Sonr

References

External links 
  Govt of MP schedule caste and schedule tribe welfare department
  Department of tribal development, MP government
 Census 2011 - Madhya Pradesh

Scheduled Tribes of India
Social groups of Madhya Pradesh